"Somewhere Over the Rainbow/What a Wonderful World" (also known as "Over the Rainbow/What a Wonderful World") is a medley of "Over the Rainbow" and "What a Wonderful World", recorded by Hawaiian singer Israel Kamakawiwoʻole. First released on the 1990 album Ka ʻAnoʻi, an acoustic rendition of the medley became notable after its release on his 1993 album Facing Future.

In 2020, it was selected for preservation in the United States National Recording Registry by the Library of Congress as being "culturally, historically, or aesthetically significant".

Recording history
The song was originally recorded in a spur-of-the-moment demo session in 1988. Israel called the recording studio at 3am, and was given a 15-minute deadline to arrive by recording engineer Milan Bertosa. Bertosa recalled, “Israel was probably like 500 pounds. And the first thing at hand is to find something for him to sit on." The building security found Israel a large steel chair. "Then I put up some microphones, do a quick sound check, roll tape, and the first thing he does is 'Somewhere Over the Rainbow.' He played and sang, one take, and it was over."

At the time, copies of the acoustic recording were made only for Kamakawiwoʻole himself and Bertosa. The song was re-recorded as an "upbeat Jawaiian version" for Kamakawiwoʻole's debut album Ka ʻAnoʻi, listed as "Over the Rainbow/What a Wonderful World." In 1993, five years after the original recording, Bertosa played the acoustic version for producer Jon de Mello while the two were completing work on Facing Future, and de Mello decided to include it on the album as "Somewhere Over the Rainbow/What a Wonderful World".

"Somewhere Over the Rainbow/What a Wonderful World" reached number 12 on Billboard'''s Hot Digital Tracks chart the week of January 31, 2004 (for the survey week ending January 18, 2004).

Impact in popular culture
According to the Israel Kamakawiwoʻole website, Universal Studios first became interested in using the song in the movie and on the soundtrack for Meet Joe Black after director Martin Brest became interested in it.  Kamakawiwoʻole's recording of "Somewhere Over the Rainbow/What a Wonderful World" has been used on other soundtracks as well, including the soundtracks for Finding Forrester; 50 First Dates; Fred Claus; Happy, Happy; Marilyn Hotchkiss' Ballroom Dancing and Charm School; The Healer; and IMAX: Hubble 3D. It was also featured on TV series like Charmed, ER, Scrubs, Cold Case, Glee, the UK original version of Life On Mars, and more.

Other cover versions
Other artists have recorded the medley as well. Néstor Torres recorded a jazz flute arrangement on his 1994 album Burning Whispers. Cliff Richard recorded his own version of the medley, released as a single from the 2001 album Wanted, which peaked at number 11 on the UK Official Charts in 2001.

Aselin Debison recorded the medley for her 2002 album Sweet Is the Melody. Elisabeth von Trapp included her interpretation of the medley in her album Poetic License, released in June 2004.

During season seven of American Idol, Jason Castro performed a cover of the song for his "Top 8" performance. Maddie Poppe and Caleb Lee Hutchinson performed the song as a duet during the grand finale of season sixteen of American Idol.

In the fifth season of the NBC television show Scrubs, a cappella band The Blanks performed a rendition of "Somewhere Over The Rainbow". The rendition was later released on their album Riding The Wave''.

Charts

Weekly charts

Year-end charts

Decade-end charts

Certifications

See also
 World Digital Song Sales

References

External links
 
 
 

Hawaiian music
Music medleys
1993 songs
1993 singles
Ultratop 50 Singles (Wallonia) number-one singles
American reggae songs
United States National Recording Registry recordings